The 2015–16 Jacksonville State Gamecocks men's basketball team represented Jacksonville State University during the 2015–16 NCAA Division I men's basketball season. The Gamecocks, led by eighth year head coach James Green, played their home games at the Pete Mathews Coliseum and were members of the East Division of the Ohio Valley Conference. They finished the season 8–23, 4–12 in OVC play to finish in last place in the East Division. They failed to qualify for the OVC tournament.

On March 16, Jacksonville State and head coach James Green mutually agreed to part ways. He finished at Jacksonville State with an eight-year record of 89–153. On April 6, 2016, the school hired Ray Harper as head coach.

Roster

Schedule

|-
!colspan=9 style="background:#; color:white;"| Regular season

|-
!colspan=9 style="background:#; color:white;"| Ohio Valley Conference regular season

References

Jacksonville State Gamecocks men's basketball seasons
Jacksonville State